Robrielle Kory Chapman (born July 13, 1980) is an American football running back. He was originally signed by the Baltimore Ravens as an undrafted free agent in 2004. He played college football at Jacksonville State.

Chapman has also been a member of the New England Patriots, Indianapolis Colts and Cleveland Browns. He has earned two Super Bowl rings - one with the Patriots and one with the Colts.

Early years
Chapman attended South Panola High and helped them to the Class 5A State Championship as a senior.

College career
Chapman played college football at Jacksonville State. He set a school record by rushing for 298 yards against Tennessee-Martin. He majored in psychology.

Professional career

2004
Chapman was signed by the Baltimore Ravens as an undrafted rookie free agent but was waived at the end of training camp. He was picked up by the New England Patriots on September 7 were he spent time on and off the practice squad.

2005
Chapman was allocated to NFL Europe and played ten times for the Cologne Centurions. During his time there he rushed for 718 yards on 126 carries and five touchdowns. He was waived by the Patriots and then re-signed to their practice squad. The Indianapolis Colts signed him to their active roster on September 21 and made his NFL debut versus the Cleveland Brownson September 25 [San Francisco 49ers] on October 2.

External links
Cleveland Browns bio
Indianapolis Colts bio
New England Patriots bio

1980 births
Living people
People from Batesville, Mississippi
American football running backs
Northwest Mississippi Rangers football players
Jacksonville State Gamecocks football players
Baltimore Ravens players
New England Patriots players
Cologne Centurions (NFL Europe) players
Indianapolis Colts players
Cleveland Browns players